Richard Payne may refer to:

Sportsmen
Richard Payne (cricketer, born 1827) (1827–1906), English cricketer
Richard Selwyn Payne (1885–1949), English cricketer

Others
Richard Payne (priest) (died 1507), Canon of Windsor
Rick Payne, fictional character in Ghost Whisperer
Ricky Payne, musician in The Flying Pickets

See also
Richard Payn, member of parliament for Shaftesbury